The Roman tuba, or trumpet was a military signal instrument used by the ancient Roman military and in religious rituals. They would signal troop movements such as retreating, attacking, or charging. As well as when guards should mount, sleep, or change posts. Thirty-six or thirty-eight tubicines were assigned to each Roman legion. The tuba would be blown twice each spring in military, governmental, or religious functions. This ceremony was known as the tubilustrium. It was also used in ancient Roman triumphs. It was considered a symbol of war and battle. The instrument was used by the Etruscans in their funerary rituals. It continued to be used in ancient Roman funerary practices. 

Roman tuba were usually straight cynical instruments with a bell at the end. They were typically made of metals such as silver, bronze, or lead and measured around 4.33 ft or 1.31 meters.  Their players, known as the tubicines or tubatores were well-respected in Roman society. The tuba was only capable of producing rhythmic sounds on one or two pitches. Its noise was often described as terrible, raucous, or hoarse. Ancient writers describe the tuba as invoking fear and terror in those who heard it.

References

Bibliography 
 
 
 
 
 
 
 
 
 
 
 
 
 
 
 
 
 
 
 
 
 
 
 
 
 
 
 
 
Ancient Roman legionary equipment
Tuba
Natural horns and trumpets